In particle physics, the chargino is a hypothetical particle which refers to the mass eigenstates of a charged superpartner, i.e. any new electrically charged fermion (with spin 1/2) predicted by supersymmetry. They are linear combinations of the charged wino and charged higgsinos. The heavier chargino can decay through the neutral Z boson to the lighter chargino. Both can decay through a charged W boson to a neutralino:

  →  + 
  →  + 
  →  +

See also 
 List of hypothetical particles 
 Weakly Interacting Slender Particle

References

External links 
 http://lepsusy.web.cern.ch/lepsusy/www/inoslowdmsummer02/charginolowdm_pub.html
 

Supersymmetric quantum field theory
Hypothetical elementary particles